Banking in Estonia covers banking in Estonia.  Banking started with the establishment of the central bank, the Bank of Estonia in 1919.  It lost control during the Soviet period when banking was controlled from Moscow by Soviet powers.  It was reestablished in 1990.  it consists of the central bank and a number of commercial banks providing banking and financial services. Many of the commercial banks operating in Estonia are foreign banks primely from Scandinavia.

History

Pre-WWII
On 24 February 1919, the central bank – Bank of Estonia – was established.

In 1940, when Estonia was incorporated to Soviet Union, the Bank of Estonia was nationalized.

Soviet period
During Soviet period, banking in Estonia was regulated by Soviet powers (see Banking in Russia#Soviet period).

After restoration
Bank of Estonia was re-established on 1 January 1990.

In early 1992, both liquidity problems and structural weakness stemming from the communist era precipitated a banking crisis. As a result, effective bankruptcy legislation was enacted and privately owned; well-managed banks emerged as market leaders. Today, near-ideal conditions for the banking sector exist. Foreigners are not restricted from buying bank shares or acquiring majority holdings.

On 20–22 June, the monetary reform of Estonia took place. During the reform, Soviet roubles were exchanged to Estonian krones.

On 23 June 1992, Estonia became a member of World Bank.

In 1992, 21 commercial banks established Estonian Banking Association. 

In 2004, Estonia became a member of European Union. After joining, preparatory works for euro started. Since 2011, euro is the new currency in Estonia.

As of 2017, the association has 13 member banks. As of 2017, operation rights have been given to 9 credit institution. The most popular banks are Swedbank, SEB Bank, Nordea Bank ja LHV Bank. Most of the banks in Estonia are actually sister enterprises of Swedish bank groups. However, e.g. LHV Bank is established in Estonia.

Banks and credit institutions in Estonia

 AS Inbank
 AS LHV Pank
 Coop Pank aktsiaselts
 TALLINNA ÄRIPANGA AS
 AS SEB Pank
 Bigbank AS
 Luminor Bank AS
 Swedbank AS

Branches of foreign banks:
 AS Citadele banka Estonian branch
 Folkefinans AS Estonian branch
 Nordea Bank AB Estonian branch
 OP Corporate Bank plc Estonian branch
 Scania Finans AB Estonian branch
 Svenska Handelsbanken AB Estonian branch
 TF Bank AB (publ.) Estonian branch

See also
 List of banks in Estonia

References

External links
 Estonian Banking Association